Zolmabad-e Olya (also Romanized as Z̧olmābād-e ‘Olyā; also known as Z̧olmābād-e Bālā) is a village in Cham Chamal Rural District, Bisotun District, Harsin County, Kermanshah Province, Iran. At the 2006 census, its population was 176, in 40 families.

References 

Populated places in Harsin County